Dead to Rights is a top-down shooter video game for the Game Boy Advance. It was developed by Torus Games and published by Namco in 2004. It is loosely based on the original Dead to Rights console game.

Reception

The game received "generally unfavorable reviews" according to video game review aggregator Metacritic.

References

External links
 

2004 video games
Game Boy Advance games
Game Boy Advance-only games
Namco games
Video games about police officers
Video games developed in Australia
Torus Games games
Single-player video games